Atanas Tendeng (born 23 June 1970) is a Senegalese footballer. He played in seven matches for the Senegal national football team from 1993 to 1994. He was also named in Senegal's squad for the 1994 African Cup of Nations tournament.

References

1970 births
Living people
Senegalese footballers
Senegal international footballers
1994 African Cup of Nations players
Place of birth missing (living people)
Association football forwards